The canton of Bégard is an administrative division of the Côtes-d'Armor department, northwestern France. Its borders were modified at the French canton reorganisation which came into effect in March 2015. Its seat is in Bégard.

It consists of the following communes:
 
Bégard
Berhet
Brélidy
Caouënnec-Lanvézéac
Cavan
Coatascorn
Kermoroc'h
Landebaëron
Mantallot
Pédernec
Ploëzal
Plouëc-du-Trieux
Pluzunet
Pontrieux
Prat
Quemper-Guézennec
Quemperven
Runan
Saint-Clet
Saint-Laurent
Squiffiec
Tonquédec
Trégonneau

References

Cantons of Côtes-d'Armor